'El Trono de México' is a Regional Mexican band from Mexico state, founded in 2004. El Trono de México began its career with "Registros Skalona". They released the albums Dos veces Mexicano (2004), El pesudo (2005),  El muchacho alegre (2006), and Fuego Nuevo (2007). The last two albums contain the biggest hits of the group: "No Te Apartes de Mi", "Ganas de Volver Amar", and "Se Fue". They were one of the biggest Duranguense artists during the genre’s heyday in the mid to late 2000s. In more recent years, they have also recorded songs in the Tierra Caliente style.

Discography

Albums
2004: Soy Dos Veces Mexicano
2005: El Pesudo
2006: El Muchacho Alegre
2007: Fuego Nuevo
2008: Cruzando Fronteras
2008: Almas Gemelas
2009: Hasta mi final
2010: Quiero Decirte Que Te Amo
2011: Sigo Estando Contigo
2012: A Corazon Abierto
2013: Irremplazable
2014: Que Bonita Es La Vida
2018: Cumpliendo Sueños
2021: Esclavo y Rey

Compilations
2008: Las Famosas del Trono: Grandes Éxitos
2015: Los Mas Grandes

Live albums
2009: Desde la Patria en Vivo!2010: En Vivo Desde Nueva York''

References

External links
El Trono de Mexico Official Website
Myspace
Twitter
Facebook

Duranguense music groups
Mexican musical groups
Universal Music Latin Entertainment artists